The Legend of the Underground is a 2021 American documentary film, directed and produced by Nneka Onuorah
and Giselle Bailey. John Legend serves as an executive producer under his Get Lifted Film Company banner. It follows several non-conformist youth in Nigeria as they fight rampant discrimination either to stay or flee to live elsewhere.

The film had its world premiere at the Tribeca Film Festival on June 10, 2021. It was released on June 29, 2021, by HBO.

Synopsis
Several non-conformist youth in Nigeria fight rampant discrimination as they decide whether to stay or flee to live elsewhere in another country. They spark a cultural revolution that challenges the ideals of gender, conformity and civil rights in Nigeria.

Release
The film had its world premiere at the Tribeca Film Festival on June 10, 2021. It was released on June 29, 2021.

Critical reception
The Legend of the Underground holds a 100% approval rating on review aggregator website Rotten Tomatoes, based on 8 reviews, with a weighted average of 7.90/10.

Accolades

References

External links
 
 
 

2021 films
2021 documentary films
2021 LGBT-related films
American documentary films
Nigerian documentary films
Documentary films about LGBT culture
Documentary films about politics
HBO documentary films
American LGBT-related films
Nigerian LGBT-related films
2020s English-language films
2020s American films